James Montgomery Gilmour (4 January 1881 – 18 December 1918) was an Irish-born New Zealand rugby league footballer who played in the 1910s.

Playing career
Gilmour moved to Australia in 1911, playing for North Sydney alongside compatriot Billy Mitchell until heading north to play for Queensland. Gilmour played all three matches against the touring New Zealand side before joining the New Zealanders for matches against Hunter River and New South Wales.

He again toured Australia with New Zealand in 1912. Prior to leaving he scored 5 tries for New Zealand against Auckland along with a conversion.

Military service and death
Gilmour served as a private with the New Zealand Expeditionary Force in World War I. He sailed from New Zealand with the 43rd reinforcements on 17 August 1918 and died of pneumonia at Tidworth Hospital, Wiltshire, England on 18 December 1918. He was buried at Tidworth Military Cemetery.

References

New Zealand national rugby league team players
New Zealand rugby league players
Rugby league centres
Wellington rugby league team players
1881 births
1918 deaths
People from County Londonderry
Deaths from pneumonia in England
North Sydney Bears players
Queensland rugby league team players
New Zealand military personnel killed in World War I
Irish emigrants to New Zealand (before 1923)